Lynn Kiro (born 6 August 1995) is a South African tennis coach and former player.

On the ITF Junior Circuit, she achieved her highest ranking of world No. 60 in March 2013. In April 2013 she was South Africa's numer-two-ranked female junior tennis player, behind Ilze Hattingh.

On the pro circuit, Kyro has reached two $10k doubles finals alongside Malagasy Zarah Razafimahatratra, winning one and losing one. Her highest singles ranking is 840 while her highest in doubles is 744. In 2012, Kyro made her debut for the South Africa Fed Cup team, for which she plays doubles.

Kiro attended Texas Tech University from 2013–2017 and had a decorated collegiate tennis career. She is currently head coach of women’s tennis at Wagner College.

ITF Circuit finals

Doubles: 4 (3–1)

Fed Cup participation

Doubles: 2 (1–1)

References

External links
 
  
 

1995 births
Living people
South African expatriates in the United States
South African female tennis players
White South African people